No-code development platforms (NCDPs) allow programmers and non-programmers to create application software through graphical user interfaces and configuration instead of traditional computer programming. No-code development platforms are closely related to low-code development platforms as both are designed to expedite the application development process. However, unlike low-code, no-code development platforms do not allow you to writing code at all, generally offering prebuilt templates that businesses can build apps with. These platforms have both increased in popularity as companies deal with the parallel trends of an increasingly mobile workforce and a limited supply of competent software developers.

No-code development platforms are closely related to visual programming languages. As NCDP has grown, no-code and low-code AI tools have also been developed, allowing developers to build AI applications without writing any code at all.

Use 
NCDPs are used to meet the needs of companies that are seeking to digitize processes through cloud-based mobile applications. No-code tools are often designed with line of business users in mind as opposed to traditional IT. This shift in focus is meant to help accelerate the development cycle by bypassing traditional IT development constraints of time, money, and scarce software development human capital resources to allow teams to align their business strategy with a rapid development process. NCDPs also often leverage enterprise-scale APIs and web service catalogs, open data sets, and tested and proven template galleries, to help integrate existing business systems while adding a practical layer of user functionality.

The transition from traditional enterprise software to a lean development methodology is also changing the role of traditional IT leaders and departments. Whereas IT once provided not only approval of new technology but procurement and development of new tools, IT's role is now increasingly one of governance over line of business who develop niche tools for their work stream.

The potential benefits of utilizing a NCDP include:
Access - By 2018, it has been estimated that over half of all B2E (business-to-employee) mobile apps would be created by enterprise business analysts using codeless tools. This ongoing shift is increasing the number of potential app creators from individuals with coding skills to anyone with internet access and functional business acumen.
Agility - NCDPs typically provide some degree of templated user-interface and user experience functionality for common needs such as forms, workflows, and data display allowing creators to expedite parts of the app creation process.
Richness - NCDPs which at one point were limited to more basic application functions increasingly provide a level of feature-richness and integrations that allows users to design, develop, and deploy apps that meet specific business needs.
Automation - The common worker is becoming busier and working longer hours on average and with the proliferation of low code software tools and more access to business APIs, there is a clear opportunity for workers to automate their current tasks using these new no-code development platforms.

Security concerns 
Some writers raise concerns over platform security, particularly for apps that handle consumer data. Proponents of NCDP claim that custom code is often a greater security risk than platform code which has been validated by its consistent use across multiple applications. No-code solutions allow platforms to hide what happens behind the scenes from users, allowing users to change or modify a field while mitigating certain errors which could compromise security.

No/low-code platforms may also offer some of the following security features:

 Platform security audits and compliance.
 Single sign on and authentication.
 Platform access control.
 Application access control and audits.
 Secure code using plugins.
 Secure API endpoints.

See also
 Flow-based programming
 List of online database creator apps
 Low-code development platforms
 Rapid application development
 Lean software development
 Platform as a service
 Software development

References

External links 
 Pattani, Aneri (16 November 2016) "A coding revolution in the office cube sends message of change to IT". CNBC. Retrieved 15 November 2017.

Enterprise architecture
Software development